The Best American Comics was a yearly anthology of comics in the United States published by Houghton Mifflin from 2006 to 2019 as part of The Best American Series.

Stories were chosen using the same procedure as the other Best American titles, whereby a series editor chose 80–120 candidates from which a guest editor picked about 20 for publication. Most of the runner-up stories were listed in the appendix. The series editors were Anne Elizabeth Moore (2006–07), Jessica Abel & Matt Madden (2008–2013), and Bill Kartalopoulos (2014–2019).

On September 30, 2020, Kartalopoulos announced on Twitter that the series had been discontinued. He also provided a more detailed account of his time working on the series and its cancellation on his personal website.

Guest editors
 2006: Harvey Pekar
 2007: Chris Ware
 2008: Lynda Barry
 2009: Charles Burns
 2010: Neil Gaiman
 2011: Alison Bechdel
 2012: Françoise Mouly
 2013: Jeff Smith
 2014: Scott McCloud
 2015: Jonathan Lethem
 2016: Roz Chast
 2017: Ben Katchor
 2018: Phoebe Gloeckner
 2019: Jillian Tamaki

References

2006 comics debuts
2019 comics endings
Book series introduced in 2006
Comics
Books about comics
Comics anthologies
Houghton Mifflin books